André Donnet (born 27 February 1922) was a French bobsledder who competed in the two-man event at the 1956 Winter Olympics.

References

External links
 

1922 births
Possibly living people
French male bobsledders
Olympic bobsledders of France
Bobsledders at the 1956 Winter Olympics
Place of birth missing